Cutshall is a surname. Notable people with the surname include: 

Cutty Cutshall (1911–1968), American jazz trombonist
Lindsi Cutshall (born 1990), American soccer player